Elamton is an unincorporated community in Morgan County, Kentucky. Elamton lies at an elevation of 833 feet (254 m).

A post office was established in the community in 1883, and named for its postmaster James S. Elam.

References

Unincorporated communities in Kentucky
Unincorporated communities in Morgan County, Kentucky